Schwaben Creek is a tributary of Mahanoy Creek in Northumberland County, Pennsylvania, in the United States. The creek has two named tributaries, which both join Schwaben Creek fairly close to its mouth. The tributaries are called Middle Creek and Mouse Creek. Schwaben Creek flows through Upper Mahanoy Township, Washington Township, and Jackson Township. Nearly all of the creek's watershed is devoted to agricultural land and forests, although there is some development. Painted furniture also was made in the Schwaben Creek valley in the 18th and 19th centuries. The creek is in the ridge-and-valley geographical province.

Course

Schwaben Creek starts in Mahanoy Township, south of Line Mountain. The creek flows westward through a valley, going past the communities of Leck Kill and Greenbrier before exiting Mahanoy Township. Upon exiting Mahanoy Township, Schwaben Creek flows into Washington Township. Shortly after entering Washington Township, the creek flows northwest to pass by the Himmels Church, where it picks up its tributary Middle Creek. It then flows westward past the community of Rebuck, and the Rebuck Church before turning southwest and then west again. The creek's valley begins getting wider as it passes St. Peters Church and leaves Washington Township. Schwaben Creek then enters Jackson Township, where it bends southwards, picking up Mouse Creek at the community of Red Cross. The creek then turns northwest and flows under Pennsylvania Route 225 to enter Mahanoy Creek.

Tributaries
Middle Creek is one tributary of Schwaben Creek. Middle Creek flows into Schwaben Creek approximately three quarters of the way from the source to the mouth. Mouse Creek is another tributary of Schwaben Creek. It has a drainage area of 7.1 square miles. The creek joins Schwaben Creek about half a mile from the latter creek's confluence with Mahanoy Creek.

Watershed

Townships in the Schwaben Creek watershed include Washington Township and Upper Mahanoy Township. The total area of the creek's watershed is 22.48 square miles. The watershed has a total of  stream distance.

Approximately 55% of the land in the Schwaben Creek watershed is devoted to agriculture. An additional 41% of the land consists of forests. 3% of the land in the watershed is termed "low-intensity development" by the Environmental Protection Agency.

 of the Schwaben Creek watershed consist of pastures and similar land.  of the watershed are devoted to cropland.  are devoted to forest.  are devoted to low-intensity development.  of the watershed are devoted to unpaved roads.  are labeled as "transition" by the Environmental Protection Agency.  of the watershed consist of wetlands.

The Himmel's Church Covered Bridge crosses Schwaben Creek at Rebuck. It was built in 1874.

Hydrology

Almost all of the streams in the Schwaben Creek watershed are considered "impaired" by the Pennsylvania Department of Environmental Protection. The exception is the headwaters of Schwaben Creek's tributary, Middle Creek.

Schwaben Creek, along with Little Mahanoy Creek, are the only tributaries of Mahanoy Creek that are not affected by the mining industry.

Geography and geology
The creek and its entire watershed is located in the ridge-and-valley physiographic province. The rocks on the surface of the creek's watershed are primarily interbedded sedimentary rock. The main soil group is the C group.

Erosion channels are present in impaired parts of the streams in the Schwaben Creek watershed. The streambanks of many streams in the watershed are also eroded.

A rock formation consisting of coarse white or light gray sandstone on top of a layer of buff and yellow colored rock passes through the Schwaben Creek watershed.

History
Schwaben Creek used to also be known as Himmels Creek, or Greenbriar Creek.

Schwaben Creek takes its name from the German region of Swabia (German: Schwaben). The name reflects the homeland of the area's settlers. A similarly named, but otherwise unrelated, Swabia Creek exists in Berks and Lehigh Counties, Pennsylvania, about 75 miles east of Schwaben Creek.

A large number of furniture pieces were made in the Schwaben Creek valley in the very late 18th century and early 1800s. The furniture was made by Pennsylvania German inhabitants, including Johannes Mayer. The types of furniture included blanket chests, chests of drawers, and cupboards. The 2013 book Encyclopedia of American Folk Art called the furniture from the Schwaben Creek valley "the most exuberant and unique paint-decorated furniture".

An eastward-running road between Sunbury and Paxtang Road (also known as Tulpehocken Road) was laid out in 1788.

Schwaben Creek has been recognized as an impaired watershed since 2002.

Plants and animals
Schwaben Creek is stocked with trout each year between February 15 and July 31. Livestock have access to parts of the creek. There are a total of twenty known species of fish in the creek near the community of Red Cross.

There are few or no riparian buffers in the parts of Schwaben Creek that are in agricultural land.

See also
Zerbe Run, next tributary of Mahanoy Creek going upstream
List of rivers of Pennsylvania
List of tributaries of Mahanoy Creek

References 

Rivers of Northumberland County, Pennsylvania
Tributaries of Mahanoy Creek
Rivers of Pennsylvania